Norman DePoe (4 May 1917 - 13 March 1980), was a reporter for the Canadian Broadcasting Corporation for eight years in the 1960s covering national and international affairs.

Born in Portland, Oregon, he arrived in Canada at age 6, attended the University of British Columbia and then the University of Toronto after serving "as a signals corps captain in Italy and northwest Europe during WWII." After joining the CBC news service in 1948 he was a creator of its television news broadcast in the following decade, and a household name. "He set standards that proved enduring" though his fame was primarily in the 1960s and he died a decade later at age 63.

See also
 List of Canadian Broadcasting Corporation personalities

References

1917 births
1980 deaths
American emigrants to Canada
Journalists from Portland, Oregon
University of British Columbia alumni
Canadian male journalists
20th-century American non-fiction writers
20th-century American male writers
American male non-fiction writers